James B. Van Dyke (October 2, 1898 – August 30, 1980) was an American football player.  A native of Louisville, Kentucky, he played professional football as a back for the Louisville Brecks in the National Football League (NFL). He appeared in five NFL games during the 1921, 1922, and 1923 seasons.

References

1898 births
1980 deaths
Louisville Brecks players
Players of American football from Louisville, Kentucky